Reductoderces araneosa is a moth of the family Psychidae. It was described by Edward Meyrick in 1914. It is endemic to New Zealand and can be found in the lower part of the South Island. The preferred habitat of R. araneosa is on the edge of native beech forest. The larvae construct a case made from silk, moss and lichens and emerge from it to feed. The female of this species is wingless. The males of this species are on the wing in November and February and have been captured in the early morning.

Taxonomy
This species was first described by Edward Meyrick and originally named Mallobathra araneosa. In 1927 Alfred Philpott discussed and illustrated the male genitalia of this species. 1928 George Hudson discussed and illustrated this species in his 1928 book The butterflies and moths of New Zealand. The male lectotype specimen, collected at Ben Lomond in Otago, is held at the Natural History Museum, London.

Description

Hudson described the adult of this species as follows:
 

The female of this species is wingless. This species can be identified by its delicate appearance and semi-transparent forewings.

Distribution
This species is endemic to New Zealand and has been observed in Dunedin, in the Otago Region and at the Hump, in the Longwood Range and in the Hunter Range all in the Southland Region.

Habitat

This species inhabits the edges of native beech forest.

Behaviour 
The larvae of this species, and of all species in the genus, create cases from silk and pieces of lichen, moss and silk. When the female emerges from their larval case, she clings to it and emits a pheromone to attract a mate. Hudson stated that he captured adult specimens of this species in the early morning. Adults of this species are on the wing in November and February.

References

Moths described in 1914
Moths of New Zealand
Psychidae
Endemic fauna of New Zealand
Taxa named by Edward Meyrick
Endemic moths of New Zealand